Linda Vista may refer to:
 Linda Vista Community Hospital, Los Angeles, California, United States
 Linda Vista, Pasadena, California, United States
 Linda Vista, San Diego, California, United States
 Linda Vista, Tlacotalpan, Veracruz, Mexico
 The original name of Palisades Park in Santa Monica, California